Colotis vesta, the veined tip, veined orange or veined golden Arab, is a butterfly of the family Pieridae. It is found in the Afrotropical realm.

The adults fly year-round, peaking in late summer and autumn.

The larvae feed on Maerua angolensis.

Subspecies
Listed alphabetically:
 C. v. amelia (Lucas, 1852) (Mauritania, Senegal, Gambia, Mali, Burkina Faso, northern Ghana, northern Nigeria)
 C. v. argillaceus (Butler, 1877) (southern Mozambique, southern Zimbabwe, South Africa, Eswatini)
 C. v. catachrysops (Butler, 1878) (coast of Kenya, coast of Tanzania)
 C. v. hanningtoni (Butler, 1883) (north-eastern Uganda, north-western Kenya, northern Tanzania)
 C. v. kagera Congdon, Kielland & Collins, 1998 (south-western Rwanda, north-western Tanzania)
 C. v. mutans (Butler, 1877) (Zambia, Malawi, northern Mozambique, northern Zimbabwe, northern Botswana, northern Namibia)
 C. v. princeps Talbot, 1939 (south-eastern Sudan, Uganda, Democratic Republic of the Congo)
 C. v. rhodesinus (Butler, 1893) (western Tanzania, Zambia, Democratic Republic of the Congo)
 C. v. velleda (Lucas, 1852) (Sudan)
 C. v. vesta (Reiche, 1849) (Ethiopia, Somalia)

References

Butterflies described in 1849
vesta
Butterflies of Africa